The Devil's Nose is a steep but small mountain ridge that spans from southwest to northeast between the Little Cacapon and Potomac rivers in northeastern Hampshire County, West Virginia. From its southern end near Neals Run on Johnsons Hollow, The Nose rises from the landscape curving along a bend in the Little Cacapon River. From Johnsons Hollow, The Nose continues northeast flanked to its west by a plain at the Little Cacapon's mouth into the Potomac, and to its east by The Nose Hollow and Neals Run-Paw Paw Road (West Virginia Secondary Route 2/6). The Devil's Nose reaches the Potomac River shortly before the Morgan County line. The Baltimore & Ohio Railroad separates The Nose from the Potomac's edge. On the Morgan County line is located the "Niagara Falls" of The Nose Hollow's stream shortly before it, too, reaches the Potomac.

See also
List of geographical noses

References

Ridges of Hampshire County, West Virginia
Ridges of West Virginia